Fast RMX (stylized as FAST rmx) is a racing video game developed and published by Shin'en Multimedia for the Nintendo Switch. It is the third installment in the Fast series. It was released on March 3, 2017 on the Nintendo eShop as a launch title for the Nintendo Switch. The game includes all the courses and downloadable content from the previous game, Fast Racing Neo, in addition to 6 new courses for a total of 30 courses. An additional free update was released on September 13, 2017 which added 6 extra courses, for a total of 36. The game received a physical release limited to 6,000 copies in 2022.

Gameplay 
Like most racing video games, players must reach the end of a track as soon as possible. Unique to the Fast series is the color switch mechanic, where players collect energy to switch between two colors. Each color has respective boosts and jump pads, which can only be used if a player is currently its respective color. Upon completing a race, players are rewarded a number of points, depending on which place of 8 they finished in. At the end of a cup, the player must rank in the top 3 of racers to unlock the next cup. The player has 12 cups of 3 courses available, with only 3 cups to choose from at the beginning of the game. The game can also be played online with up to 4 players locally and up to 8 players online.

The game features a single-player campaign with 10 cups to unlock, containing 30 courses total, along with 15 unlockable vehicles. The game also contains multiplayer components, featuring split-screen multiplayer mode for up to 4 players, as well as local communication and online modes with 2-8 players. Another extra mode called Hero Mode is available, using the same tracks as the Campaign with higher difficulty and with the boost meter doubling as a health bar, similarly to games in the F-Zero franchise.

Development
The game fully supports the unique control options and features of the Nintendo Switch, such as HD Rumble, motion controls, single Joy-Con play, and the Pro Controller. The game is capable of running in up to 1080p at 60FPS in docked mode.

It was announced on March 5, 2017 that, like its predecessor, the game would be receiving free updates with extra content in the future. The first major update was released on April 19, 2017. It was confirmed to include a Time Attack mode and online friend support. An additional free update was released on September 13, 2017 which added 6 extra courses, as well as improving CPU AI, fixing bugs, and adding friend list activity features.

Reception 

Like the game's predecessors, Fast RMX is also often compared to the games of the F-Zero and Wipeout series.

On Metacritic, the game holds a Metascore of 81 out of 100 points, based on 54 reviews. Nintendo Life gave the game a 4.7, praising the game's diverse selection of vehicles and tracks. IGN rated the game with 7.4 out of 10 points, describing it as a "[...] racer that borrows heavily from the classic Wipeout and F-Zero games." The website praised the game's AI, variety of courses and its graphical presentation. The online mode was criticized for its lack of custom functions and not featuring a lobby system.

References

External links

2017 video games
Science fiction racing games
Multiplayer and single-player video games
Nintendo Switch games
Nintendo Switch-only games
Video games developed in Germany